Eckert House may refer to:

in the United States (by state)
Eckert House (Guttenberg, Iowa), listed on the National Register of Historic Places in Clayton County, Iowa
Ignatius Eckert House, Hastings, Minnesota, listed on the NRHP in Dakota County, Minnesota
Eckert House (San Angelo, Texas), listed on the National Register of Historic Places in Tom Green County, Texas